Baron Jacques Salomon François Joseph Léon de Herckenrode (1818–1880) was a Belgian genealogist.

Life
Herckenrode was born in Huy on 15 March 1818, the son of Auguste-Joseph de Herckenrode and Pauline-Charlotte de Berlaere. He spent most of his life in Sint-Truiden. In 1846 he became a corresponding member of the Académie d'Archéologie de Belgique, frequently publishing in the Annales de l'Académie d'Archéologie de Belgique. He died in Ghent on 22 October 1880.

Publications
 Vie de la comtesse Marie d'Oyenbrugge, dite de Duras, première supérieure du couvent de Berlaymont (Brussels, 1844)
 Collection de tombes, épitaphes et blasons recueillis dans les églises et couvents de Hesbaye (Ghent, 1845)
 Notice historique sur la commune de Rummen et sur les anciens fiefs de Grasen, Wilre, Binderveld et Weyer, en Hesbaye (Ghent, 1846)
 Généalogie historique des anciens patriarches (Bruges, 1855)
 M. de Vegiano, Nobiliaire des Pays-Bas et du comté de Bourgogne, edited by J.S.F.J.L. de Herckenrode (Ghent, 1862–1868)

References

1818 births
1880 deaths
People from Huy
Belgian genealogists
19th-century Belgian non-fiction writers